Cave of the Word Wizard is a 1982 educational children's game released for the Commodore 64 by Timeworks, Inc. It is designed to teach spelling.

Gameplay
The game is set in a wizard's cave where the player must spell words to overcome obstacles. The player spells words by typing on the keyboard and they are simultaneously displayed on the screen. The spoken commands and words are delivered in American English, through the computer audio output. Ten lists of words are provided for spelling, in graduated difficulty. You can also make custom lists. A list is selected at the start of each game.

It features a multilevel cave which the player's joystick guided character (selection of boy or girl) explores with the objective of finding a number of crystals in order to exit the dungeon. The character uses a flashlight to illuminate his/her way around the dungeon to find the crystals, which are attached to the dungeon wall in random locations.

The cave features a number of obstacles: crevasses to fall or jump down a level, rocks to trip over, puddles to slip and fall in, and scorpions and snakes to sting you. Your character can jump over these using a joystick button. If you fall or get stung, you have to use one of the 5 bandaids you started with. There are ladders to go up and down levels safely.

At intervals, the "Word Wizard" appears and commands you to spell a word. If you type the word correctly, you get rewarded with a new bandaid, and a congratulatory "well done!" or similar encouragement. If you wait too long or spell it wrongly, you get admonished, "You need work on that one!" or "It's getting darker!" (and your flashlight loses energy).

References

1982 video games
Commodore 64 games
Commodore 64-only games
Children's educational video games
Video games about witchcraft
Video games developed in the United States
Word puzzle video games